Juan Andújar (Loma de Cabrera, Dominican Republic, 1986) is a Dominican artist known by his modern paintings inspired in the ocean and rural life.

Biography
Juan Andújar was born to a family with artistics tradition. His father, José Andújar, is the director of the music academy (Academia de Música Emilio Prud'Homme) in Loma de Cabrera; his uncle Juan Plutarco Andújar  is a well known Dominican painter. In Loma de Cabrera, Juan Andújar studies music while cultivates plastic arts. There, he participated, from 2000 to 2004, on the exposition "Unidos por el arte" (United for arts) with other local artist. Later, he joined the National School of Fine Arts (Escuela Nacional de Bellas Artes) in Santo Domingo to study plastic arts.

Expositions
Juan has participated in several individual and group exhibitions at local and international localities.

Individual exhibitions
 Serena Mare, 2008, Mesa Fine Art, Santo Domingo.
 Estímulos de Vida (honoring his uncle Juan Plutarco), 2014, Shanell Art Gallery, Malecon Center, Santo Domingo

Group exhibitions
 Unidos por el arte, 2001, 2002, 2003, and 2004, Loma de Cabrera.
 Exposición anual Casa de Teatro, 2005, Santo Domingo. 
 Arte Caribeño, 2005, San Juan, Puerto Rico.
 Exposición Profundo Fundación Mir, 2005, Casa de Campo, La Romana. 
 65 Artistas Latinoamericanos. Celebración 30 años de la Galería Nader, 2006, Santo Domingo.
 Arte siempre Arte; 3ra edición, 2006, Galería Nader, Santo Domingo.
 Artistas Dominicanos en Embajada  Dominicana, Brussels, Belgium. 
 Rutas de los Murales, 2007, Hermanas Mirabal.
 Murales de Arte Dominicano, 2006, Malecón Center, Santo Domingo.

Awards
Juan Andújar has received several awards,  including:

 Medalla de Reconocimiento por el Cabildo del Distrito Nacional, Santo Domingo.
 Premio Regional de la Juventud (desarrollo cultural).
 Distinción de honor Mural Malecón Center.
 Premio Nuestra Señora de la Altagracia, 2005, Loma de Cabrera.
 Premio Casa de Teatro, 2004, Santo Domingo.

References

External links
 Galería de Arte Dominicano: Juan Andújar
 Arte Dominicano: Juan Andújar 
 Biografía Juan Andújar
 Datos Biográficos de Juan Andújar

Living people
1986 births
Dominican Republic painters
People from Loma de Cabrera